Oh!K was a Southeast Asian pay television channel owned by Warner Bros. Discovery, with content supplied by MBC.

Background
It was launched on 20 October 2014 on StarHub TV in Singapore. Its programming consists of South Korean drama, entertainment, variety and music programs supplied from Munhwa Broadcasting Corporation.

Oh!K's programming is available subtitled in local languages on optional subtitle tracks, depending on the country of the reception's market.

Closures
Oh!K was discontinued in Malaysia via Astro on 1 June 2022, and in Singapore on 15 September 2022 via SingTel TV and 16 September 2022 via StarHub TV.

References

External links

2014 establishments in Singapore
Munhwa Broadcasting Corporation television networks
Pay television
Television channels and stations established in 2014
Television channels and stations disestablished in 2022
Television stations in Malaysia
Television stations in Singapore
Warner Bros. Discovery networks
Warner Bros. Discovery Asia-Pacific